The Pimp is an EP by Fatboy Slim, released in 2002. It is the third and final EP in a series by Fatboy Slim; all three EPs were released on 19 November 2002.

Critical reception
Trouser Press praised the EP, calling the Bootsy Collins-assisted title track an "enjoyable thumping" song.

Track listing
 "The Pimp" (Collins, Cook) - 4:32 (Feat. Bootsy Collins)
 "Drop the Hate" (Remixed By Reverend H. Lidbo & The Progressive Baptist Choir Of Stockholm) (Cook, Daniels) - 7:20
 "Star 69" (X-Press 2 Wine-Em Dine-Em 69 Supamix) (Clark, Cook, McCormack) - 8:19
 "Retox" (Getting Freqy with Fatboy) (Cook) - 8:58
 "Song for Shelter" (Pete Heller Beats and Pieces) (Clark/Slim) - 9:58
 "Talkin' Bout My Baby" (Midfield General's Disco Reshuffle Mix) (Anthony/Cook/Hall/Ross) - 6:55

References

2002 EPs
Fatboy Slim EPs